Brocchinia melanacra is a species of plant in the genus Brocchinia. This species is endemic to Venezuela.

References

melanacra
Endemic flora of Venezuela
Plants described in 1951